Germán Berterame (born 13 November 1998) is an Argentine professional footballer who plays as a forward for Liga MX club Monterrey.

Honours
Individual
Liga MX Golden Boot (Shared): Apertura 2021
Liga MX All-Star: 2022

References

1998 births
Living people
Argentine footballers
Argentine expatriate footballers
Argentina youth international footballers
Argentine Primera División players
Liga MX players
San Lorenzo de Almagro footballers
Club Atlético Patronato footballers
Atlético San Luis footballers
Expatriate footballers in Mexico
Association football forwards
People from Villa María
Sportspeople from Córdoba Province, Argentina